The 2020–21 ISU World Standings and Season's World Ranking are the World Standings and Season's World Ranking published by the International Skating Union (ISU) during the 2020–21 season.

The single & pair skating and ice dance World Standings take into account the results of the 2018–19, 2019–20, and 2020–21 seasons.

The 2020–21 ISU Season's World Ranking is based on the results of the 2020–21 season only.

Due to the COVID-19 pandemic, the 2021 World Championships was the only event to affect World Standings. The ISU determined that it would be unfair to award World Standing points at the Challenger Series and Grand Prix events in light of the vast difference in skaters' travel restrictions. The Junior Grand Prix and 2021 World Junior Championships were cancelled, leaving no opportunities for junior skaters to earn World Standing Points.

World Standings for single & pair skating and ice dance

Season-end standings

Men 
.

Ladies 
.

Pairs 
.

Ice dance 
.

Season standings

Men

Ladies

Pairs

Ice dance

World standings for synchronized skating

Season-end standings 
The remainder of this section is a complete list, by level, published by the ISU.

Senior Synchronized (54 teams)

Junior Synchronized (61 teams)

References

See also 
 ISU World Standings and Season's World Ranking
 List of highest ranked figure skaters by nation
 List of ISU World Standings and Season's World Ranking statistics
 2020–21 figure skating season

External links 
 International Skating Union
 ISU World Standings for Single & Pair Skating and Ice Dance / ISU Season’s World Ranking

ISU World Standings and Season's World Ranking
World Standings and Season's Ranking
World Standings and Season's Ranking